Luc Marreel (born 2 February 1949 – 11 May 2015) was a Belgian professional darts player who competed in the 1970s, 1980s and 1990s.

Darts career

Marreel played in the BDO World Darts Championship five times. In 1981, he beat Denmark's Jan Larsen in the first round before losing in round two to Tony Brown. In 1982, Marreel beat Alistair Forrester in the first round, but lost in the second round to Sweden's Stefan Lord. In 1983, Marreel again won his first round match, defeating the Welshman Ceri Morgan 2–0 in the opening round but lost 3–0 in the second round again to Lord. Marreel suffered a first round exit in 1984 to America's Rick Ney but reached the second round once more in 1985, beating Dave Lee in round one but was defeated in the second round by 1983 World Champion Keith Deller.

Marreel also played in the Winmau World Masters twice in 1982 and 1983 but lost in the first round both times. Marreel won the Belgium National Championships in 1981 and the Belgium Gold Cup in 1982 and 1983, but his biggest tournament win was the 1983 Dutch Open.

World Championship performances

BDO
 1981: 2nd Round (lost to Tony Brown 0–2)
 1982: 2nd Round (lost to Stefan Lord 1–2)
 1983: 2nd Round (lost to Stefan Lord 0–3)
 1984: 1st Round (lost to Rick Ney 1–2)
 1985: 2nd Round (lost to Keith Deller 0–3)

External links
Profile and Stats on Darts Database

1949 births
2015 deaths
Belgian darts players
British Darts Organisation players
People from Wevelgem
Sportspeople from West Flanders